Craig Silverstein (born 1972 or 1973) is a software engineer and was the first person employed by Larry Page and Sergey Brin at Google, having studied for a PhD alongside them (though he dropped out and never earned his degree) at Stanford University.  He graduated from Harvard and was admitted to Phi Beta Kappa.

Biography
In 1993, he won ACM-ICPC programming contest as a member of Harvard University team.

His PhD supervisor was Rajeev Motwani. He served as Google’s director of technology. He resigned from the company in February 2012, to work at the Khan Academy.

He and his wife, Mary Obelnicki, are signers of The Giving Pledge.

References 

Year of birth missing (living people)
Place of birth missing (living people)
Stanford University alumni
Google employees
20th-century American Jews
1970s births
Computer scientists
Living people
Giving Pledgers
21st-century philanthropists
Harvard University alumni
Competitive programmers
21st-century American Jews